Bank of British West Africa (BBWA) was a British Overseas bank that was important in introducing modern banking into the countries that emerged from the UK's West African colonies. In 1957 it changed its name to Bank of West Africa, and in 1965 was acquired by Standard Bank.

History

1891 — Elder Dempster shipping magnate Alfred Lewis Jones (born in Carmarthen, Wales in 1845) and George William Neville (born at Richmond, near London in 1852), the local agent of Elder Dempster & Co. of Liverpool, attempted to develop a banking operation along the Guinea coast
1892 — African Banking Corporation acquired Elder Dempster's banking operations in Lagos, Nigeria. Within a year they wished to close it down. Instead, they sold the operation to A.L. Jones and Elder Dempster
1893 — Elder Dempster helped form Bank of British West Africa (BBWA) which took over the ex-ABC operation in Lagos. Eventually, BBWA established branches in Liverpool, London, and Manchester.
1894 — Elder Dempster Co, were appointed agents in Freetown, Sierra Leone and Bathurst, The Gambia for BBWA. BBWA also took over ABC's Tangier branch.
1896 — BBWA established a branch in Accra, Ghana. Its main business then was the distribution of silver coins, of which it was the sole supplier. As the only bank in the country at the time, it came to play a unique role in the economy, acting as the Central Bank. In 1902, it opened another branch in Sekondi. It opened an agency in Obuasi in 1905, which it raised to the status of a branch in 1909. In 1906 it opened a branch in Kumasi. British Bank of West Africa expanded its network to cover most of the main business centres in the Gold Coast and went on to dominate commercial banking in Ghana
1898 — BBWA established a branch in Freetown, Sierra Leone
1902 — BBWA established a branch in Bathurst, The Gambia
In about 1910 BBWA established a branch in Tenerife, in the Canary Isles
1912 — BBWA took over the activities of Bank of Nigeria, which local merchants had established in 1899 or 1902 to create a competitor to BBWA
1915 — BBWA established a branch in Douala, The Cameroons, following the Anglo-French invasion
1916 — BBWA closed its branch in Douala following Douala's transfer to French administration, but opened an agency in New York City
1918 — BBWA opened a branch in Alexandria, Egypt
1919 — Lloyds Bank and three other banks became shareholders in BBWA
1912 — BBWA re-opened a branch in Douala, French Cameroons, and in Cairo
1923 — Standard Bank of South Africa took over BBWA's New York agency. Lloyds Bank acquired Cox & Co, which had branches in Egypt, but was itself a shareholder in BBWA. To avoid competing with itself, Lloyds had BBWA transfer its Egyptian business to Lloyds Bank. In 1926 Lloyds transferred its operations in Egypt to the National Bank of Egypt
Between 1930 and 1940 BBWA closed most of its branches it had established in Morocco, the Canary Islands and Fernando Po
In 1937 or so, BBWA established a branch in Hamburg, Germany
1953 — BBWA lost its central banking functions in Ghana. The Ghanaian government established the Bank of the Gold Coast to combine commercial banking activities and central banking functions
In 1954 or so BBWA closed its Hamburg branch, which presumably had been in abeyance during World War II and reopened thereafter
1957 — Bank of British West Africa changed its name to Bank of West Africa (BWA)
1963 — BWA closed its branch in Tangier
1965 — Standard Bank acquired BWA, and renamed it Standard Bank of West Africa. SBWA acquired the Liberian and Nigerian branches of Chase Manhattan Bank in return for Chase taking a 15% stake in Standard Bank, a stake that it sold in the late 1970s. BWA still operated one branch each in the French and British Cameroon Mandates, and in Morocco
1969 — Standard Bank merged with Chartered Bank to form Standard Chartered Bank. SBWA spun off Standard Bank of Ghana, Standard Bank Nigeria, and Standard Bank of Sierra Leone, which went on to have separate histories
1 January 1985 — the Ghanaian operation became Standard Chartered Bank Ghana, under which name it continues to operate
1971 — Standard Bank of Nigeria placed 13% of its share capital with Nigerian investors. After the end of the Nigerian Civil War, Nigeria's military government sought to increase local control of the retail-banking sector. Standard Chartered Bank's investment in Standard Bank Nigeria fell to 38%, and the bank changed its name to First Bank of Nigeria in 1979. Standard Chartered sold its remaining shares in First Bank of Nigeria in 1996. The present Standard Chartered Bank Nigeria, therefore, traces its presence in Nigeria only to 1999, when the bank re-entered Nigeria with a new, wholly owned subsidiary
The present Standard Chartered Bank Sierra Leone traces its corporate history back to BBWA's commissioning the Elder Dempster as its agents in Freetown in 1894
Between 1969 and 1974, Standard Bank also closed the branches (Douala and Victoria) in Cameroon that it inherited from BWA
By 1974 SBWA had only two branches, both in The Gambia, and in 1978, SBWA transferred these two branches to Standard Bank Gambia Ltd. Until 2002, by then Standard Chartered Bank Gambia remained the only bank in The Gambia.

See also
 Banque de l'Afrique Occidentale

Sources
Baster, A.S.J. 1926/1977. The Imperial Banks. (New York: Arno Press reprint).
Fry, Richard. 1976. Bankers in West Africa : the story of the Bank of British West Africa Limited. (London: Hutchinson).

External links 

 

West Africa
Defunct banks
British West Africa
Banks of Egypt
Banks of Cameroon
Banks of the Gambia
Banks of Ghana
Banks of Sierra Leone
British Cameroon
Gold Coast (British colony)
Standard Chartered
Banks established in 1893
Banks disestablished in 1965
1893 establishments in the British Empire
1965 disestablishments in Egypt
1965 mergers and acquisitions
British companies disestablished in 1965
British companies established in 1893